Gertrude Pocte Geddes Willis  (March 9, 1878 – February 20, 1970) founded the Gertrude Geddes Willis Life Insurance Company and Gertrude Geddes Willis Funeral Home in New Orleans, Louisiana. She was one of the first women funeral directors in New Orleans.

Biography
Willis née Pocte was born in Happy Jack, Louisiana, on March 9, 1878, the daughter of Oscar Pocte and Louisa Woods Pocte.

Her first husband Clem Geddes was in the funeral business. The couple partnered with Arnold Moss to form a company that sold insurance as well as owning a funeral home.

After Clem Geddes died in 1913 she married William A. Willis. In 1940 she renamed the business the Gertrude Geddes Willis Funeral Home and Life Insurance Company. In William A. Willis died, and Gertrude continued running the company, expanding its services.

Geddes was a member of the NAACP, the YWCA, and the Ladies Auxiliary of the Knights of Peter Claver.

She died on February 20, 1970, in New Orleans.

References

External links

 Gertrude Geddes Willis Funeral Home, Inc. - Our Story

1878 births
1970 deaths
African-American women in business
People from Louisiana
African-American Catholics
Knights of Peter Claver & Ladies Auxiliary
20th-century African-American people
20th-century African-American women